This is a list of the cities and towns in Pakistan's dependent territory of Gilgit-Baltistan.

Gilgit-Baltistan